Mike Newton may refer to:

Mike Newton (racing driver) (born 1960), British businessman and racing driver
Mike Newton (American football) (born 1987), American football defensive back
Harold Newton (cricketer) (1918–2007), known as Mike, English cricketer
Mike Newton (Twilight)

See also
Michael Newton (disambiguation)